The Maestro is a 2018 American historical drama directed, produced by Adam Cushman and David J. Phillips and written by C.V. Herst, the real-life son of the film's protagonist Jerry Herst. The film features Xander Berkeley as composer Mario Castelnuovo-Tedesco, an Italian immigrant who arrived in Los Angeles in the thirties after evading Mussolini's Italy. The Maestro premiered at the Heartland Film Festival in 2017. The film was acquired for distribution by Freestyle Releasing and had a limited theatrical release in Los Angeles.

Plot 
After World War II, budding musician Jerry Herst (Leo Marks) returns to Los Angeles for one more go at becoming a successful film composer. In Los Angeles, Herst studies with the famed instructor Mario Castelnuovo-Tedesco (Xander Berkeley), whose students include John Williams, Andre Previn, Henry Mancini, Nelson Riddle and Jerry Goldsmith. Herst, who already had a hit under his belt, 1937's "So Rare", struggles between family pressure and his musical calling, as Tedesco teaches him what it means to be a successful artist. The film also features actor Jon Polito as fictional MGM executive Herbert Englehardt in what would be Polito's final performance.

Cast 

 Xander Berkeley as Mario Castelnuovo-Tedesco
 Leo Marks as Jerry Herst
 Mackenzie Astin as Sam Herst
 Sarah Clarke as Clara Castelnuovo-Tedesco
 William Russ as Abe Herst
 Jon Polito as Herbert Englehardt
 Jonathan Cherry as Ray
 Raul S. Julia as Dave
 Bobby Campo as Gene Kelly
 Joelle Sechaud as Mrs. Stella
 David J. Phillips as Jess Oppenheimer
 Alex Essoe as Cyd Charisse
 Kristen Gutoskie as Estelle Oppenheimer
 Lenny Von Dohlen as Luc
 Michael Johnston as Pietro Castelnuovo-Tedesco
 Omar Doom as Stanley Kubrick

Release 
The film played several festivals before its official release, receiving the Audience Award at the Tallgrass Film Festival in 2018, the Jury Award at the Borrego Springs Film Festival in 2019, the Silver Palm award at the 2018 Mexico International Film Festival, and the Youth Film Award at the Rhode Island International Film Festival in 2018. Actor Xander Berkeley received "Best Actor" awards at the 2017 Oaxaca Film Festival and the 2018 Albuquerque Film & Music Experience.

On Rotten Tomatoes it has a rating of 83% based on reviews from 6 critics.

References 

2018 films